David Riondino (born 10 June 1952) is an Italian actor, singer-songwriter, comedian, writer, playwright, screenwriter, director and composer.

Life and career 
Born in Florence, the son of a teacher, Riondino started his career in the mid-1970s as a member of the musical ensemble Collettivo Victor Jara. In 1979 he made his solo debut with the album David Riondino, and the same year he was the opening act in a series of concerts by Fabrizio De André and Premiata Forneria Marconi. In 1980, following his second album, Boulevard, with arrangements by Shel Shapiro, he focused on his live activity, where he mixed improvisation, music and cabaret.  

Starting from the second half of the 1980s Riondino enjoyed a large success thanks to the semi-regular participation to the Canale 5 show Maurizio Costanzo Show, where he used to improvise surreal songs imitating the style of the Brazilian singer-songwriters. In 1987 he released his third album Tango dei miracoli , whose booklet was illustrated by Milo Manara. 

Riondino's variagated career includes films, TV-series, comedy plays as well as novels, poems and several collaborations with newspapers and magazines as a humorist and a semi-serious columnist.

Filmography 
To Love the Damned (1980) 
The Night of the Shooting Stars (1982) 
Kamikazen: Last Night in Milan (1987) 
Zanzibar  (TV, 1988)
Cavalli si nasce (1988) 
La cattedra (1991) 
Ilona Arrives with the Rain (1996) 
Cuba Libre – Velocipedi ai tropici (1997, also director) 
Donna selvaggia (1998) 
Vado e torno (TV, 1998) 
L'erba proibita (2002)
Viva Zapatero!  (2005)
L'uomo che aveva picchiato la testa (2009)
Amici miei – Come tutto ebbe inizio (2011)
The Invisible Player (2016)

Discography 
 
     1979 – David Riondino (Ultima Spiaggia, ZPLS 34061) 
     1980 – Boulevard (RCA Italiana, PL 31547) 
     1987 – Tango dei miracoli (L'ALTernativa, ALT 003)  
     1989 – Racconti picareschi (CGD, CGD 20932) 
     1991 – Non svegliate l'amore (CGD, CGD 9031 74383-1) 
     1994 – Temporale (CGD, CGD 4509 96185-2) 
     1995 – Quando vengono le ballerine? (Rossodisera Records-Sony, RDS 480351)

Books 
 
     Rombi e milonghe. João Mesquinho e altre canzoni. Feltrinelli, 1993. .
     Viaggio a Cuba, with Valerio Peretti Cucchi. Zelig, 1997. . 
     Epos 92–97. L'Italia in terzine da Tangentopoli all'Ulivo, Grugliasco, Edizioni Arti grafiche San Rocco, 1998. . 
     Rumba. Itinerari cubani al ritmo della capitale, con Roberto Perini, Milano, Lizard, 1999. .
     Dante Inferno, with Sandro Lombardi, con CD, Milano, Garzanti, 2002. .
     Cantata dei pastori immobili. Racconto di un presepe vivente, illustrations by Sergio Staino. Donzelli, 2004. .
     John Martin. Il trombettiere di Apricale. Da Garibaldi a Custer, with Claudio Nobbio. Fratelli Frilli, 2007. .
     Firenze. Effequ, 2013. .

References

External links 
 
 
   

 

1952 births 
Living people
Writers from Florence
Italian comedians
Italian male stage actors 
Italian male film actors 
Italian male television actors
Italian composers 
Italian singer-songwriters 
Italian comedy musicians
Musicians from Florence
Actors from Florence